Murad Mirzayev (31 March 1976 – 3 April 2016) was an Azerbaijani officer, lieutenant colonel of Special Forces of Azerbaijan, National Hero of Azerbaijan.

Biography 
Murad Mirzayev was born on 31 March 1976 in Muğan Gəncəli village of Sabirabad District of Azerbaijan SSR. He studied in Jamshid Nakhchivanski Military Lyceum. In 1998 Mirzayev graduated from the High Military Academy in Turkey. Further he took part in military exercises in US, Romania and Jordan.

On the night from 1 to 2 April 2016 Armenian–Azerbaijani clashes took place along the line of contact in Nagorno-Karabakh and surrounding territories to the south.  On 5 April, a mutual ceasefire agreement was reached. Lieutenant colonel Murad Mirzayev died on 3 April during the battles near Talysh village.

On 10 April the body of Murad Mirzayev with the mediation of the International Committee of the Red Cross was handed over to the Azerbaijani side. On 11 April, he was buried in II Alley of Honor in Baku. A three-volley salute was performed and national anthem of Azerbaijan was played during the funerals.

On 19 April 2016 Azerbaijani President Ilham Aliyev signed orders on awarding honorary titles, orders and medals to a group of Azerbaijani military servicemen who "have distinguished exceptional bravery and heroism while preventing the Armenian military provocations on the contact line of troops and repelling the enemy's attacks on civilians from April 2 to 5". Murad Mirzayev was awarded the medal of National Hero of Azerbaijan.

He was survived by his wife, Fizza Mirzayeva, and two children, son Nurlan and daughter Deniz.

References 

National Heroes of Azerbaijan
1976 births
2016 deaths
Azerbaijani colonels
Azerbaijani military personnel killed in action
People from Sabirabad District
2016 Nagorno-Karabakh clashes
21st-century Azerbaijani Land Forces personnel
Burials at II Alley of Honor